Apartment 7A is an upcoming American psychological horror film directed by Natalie Erika James, who co-wrote the screenplay with Christian White and Skylar James, based on a story by Skylar James. It is intended to serve as a prequel to 1968's Rosemary's Baby, which was an adaptation of the novel of the same name by Ira Levin. Julia Garner, Dianne Wiest, Marli Siu and Rosy McEwen star in undisclosed roles.

Premise
The film is said to center around a young dancer who rents a room from an elderly couple.

Cast
 Julia Garner
 Dianne Wiest
 Marli Siu
 Rosy McEwen

Production
In March 2021, it was reported Natalie Erika James would direct the psychological thriller film Apartment 7A. James co-wrote the screenplay with Christian White, based on a previous draft of the script written by Skylar James. John Krasinski, Allyson Seeger, Michael Bay, Andrew Form and Brad Fuller produced the film, which was a joint-venture production between Paramount Players, Sunday Night Productions and Platinum Dunes. Following the success of the A Quiet Place franchise, the project was among several scripts that the studio was developing with a similar tone. Apartment 7A was chosen from those projects to quickly enter pre-production.

Principal photography began on March 15, 2022, in London. In April, Garner was spotted filming scenes for the 1950s-based movie in and around Beppe's Cafe, in the East End of London. On June 4, it was announced that principal photography had wrapped production in the United Kingdom. Later that month, Bloody Disgusting reported that the film was secretly a prequel to the film Rosemary's Baby. In August, the Writers Guild of America determined the film's final writing credits, revealing it to be based on the 1967 novel by Ira Levin.

References

Notes

External links
 

Upcoming films
American psychological thriller films
Films based on American horror novels
Films based on works by Ira Levin
Films produced by Michael Bay
Films produced by Andrew Form
Films produced by Bradley Fuller
Films set in apartment buildings
Films shot in the United Kingdom
Paramount Pictures films
Paramount Players films
Platinum Dunes films
Upcoming English-language films